Francisco Ducasse (born 3 December 1996) is a Chilean competitive sailor. He competed at the 2016 Summer Olympics in Rio de Janeiro, in the men's 470 class.

References

1996 births
Living people
Chilean people of French descent
Chilean male sailors (sport)
Olympic sailors of Chile
Sailors at the 2016 Summer Olympics – 470